Tangerine is a young adult novel by Edward Bloor, published in 1997 by Harcourt.

Plot 
Paul Fisher and his family move from Houston, Texas to Lake Windsor Downs in Tangerine, Florida. Erik, the older son, looks forward to a football scholarship at the University of his choice. Paul, the younger son, is visually impaired and legally blind but plays soccer. His family credits his visual injury to an incident, which he does not remember, in which at a young age, he continued to stare at a solar eclipse despite his parents' warnings not to. Soon after they unpack, Paul goes for a tour of his new school, where Mike Costello and his brother Joey are introduced. On his first day of school, Paul meets Coach Walski, the coach of the soccer team, and tries out for the team, but is later told that his visual impairment prevents his eligibility, and blames this on his mother revealing the impairment to the school administrators. One day Mike Costello is killed by lightning; Erik and his friend Arthur Bauer tell jokes after hearing the news, even though Mike was one of their teammates. 

While Paul is at school, a field of portable classrooms collapses into a sinkhole. Many people, including Paul and Joey, help rescue those trapped, and no one is seriously injured. The emergency relocation plan gives the students the choice to stay at Lake Windsor, their present school, with a different schedule and more crowded classes, or to transfer to Tangerine Middle School, on the other, poorer side of the county; Paul chooses Tangerine Middle to be able to play soccer again. When he arrives at Tangerine Middle School, he is shown around by a girl named Theresa Cruz. At lunch, Paul asks Theresa about the soccer team. Theresa tells Paul that her twin brother, Tino, is a member. She brings Paul to a soccer meet after school and he joins. At first, Paul's teammates Victor, the team captain, and Tino hesitate to befriend him, but a victory in the first game of the season (against the aggressive Palmetto Whippoorwills) convinces Victor to do so. Paul then persuades Joey Costello to join Tangerine Middle School. After a quarrel with Paul and his friends, Joey returns to Lake Windsor. Throughout the story, houses in Paul's neighborhood are covered with tents to be fumigated for termites. A young man named Luis is introduced as the older brother of Theresa and Tino. Luis works at his parents' citrus farm and is developing a new kind of tangerine called the Golden Dawn. While at Paul's house for a school project, Tino makes fun at how Erik fell down while attempting to a kick an extra point during an earlier football game, so Erik punches him. Luis goes to Erik's football practice to confront him about this, but Erik distracts him while signaling his friend Arthur to strike Luis from behind using a blackjack. This is witnessed by Paul, and Luis is found dead six days later from an aneurysm. Paul is told by Theresa not to go to the funeral because he is Erik's brother, and he grieves alone.

On Senior Awards Night, Tino and Victor attack Erik and Arthur as revenge for killing Luis. The football coach restrains Tino, but Paul distracts him by jumping on his back, so that Tino and Victor can escape. Paul runs back to his house, where a confrontation with a furious Arthur and Erik causes Paul to finally fully recall the memory he had been repressing - after spray-painting a wall and wrongfully assuming that Paul had turned them in (it was actually another kid), Erik restrained his brother while Vincent Castor (his lackey at the time, mirroring Erik's relationship with Arthur) sprayed paint into Paul's eyes as a twisted form of punishment. Paul confronts his parents about their concealment of the event. His mother cries and they admit to lying about the eclipse, stating that they were only trying to ensure that Paul never hated Erik for his actions. Paul's father finally breaks down as well when Paul asks whether they thought Paul hating himself instead would be better.

Later, Paul's mother discovers a gym bag in the Fishers' garage full of items that had gone missing from the tented houses in the neighborhood and holds a meeting to reveal that Erik and Arthur robbed the missing items. Paul's father presents a restitution proposed by the sheriff, which, if signed by all the robbery victims, would result in all victims being compensated in exchange for Erik and Arthur not having charges pressed against them. Reluctantly, the victims agree. As they leave, they find the police, led to the house by Joey, waiting outside to arrest Erik and Arthur for the murder of Luis. Paul tells the police what he saw instead of covering for his brother, and Arthur is arrested while Erik is placed under house arrest. Paul agrees to give the police a full statement to help convict them.

Shortly afterward, it was found that Antoine Thomas, one of the star players and quarterback on the Lake Windsor team, actually lived in Tangerine, causing all of the football team's records to be nullified, and destroying Erik's football legacy.

Back at the school, Paul and his mother meet with the principal, who informs him that Tino and Victor have been suspended for three weeks for attacking a student. Since Paul attacked a staff member, he was expelled from all public schools in the county. As Paul and his mother leave the school, the kids outside express approval towards him for his actions defending Tino and Victor.

Paul is enrolled in St. Anthony's, a Catholic private school, his only choice after his expulsion. The book ends with Paul being driven to his third school of the year by his father, thinking about Mike Costello and Luis and taking in the sight and smell of the orange groves. He gets emotional just thinking about what had happened to them and the effects it had on their families.

Awards
Rebecca Caudill Young Reader's Book Award Nominee (2001)
South Carolina Book Award for Junior Book Award (2000)
Michigan Library Association Thumbs Up! Award Nominee (1998)
American Library Association's Top Ten Books for Young Adults (1998)

References

1997 American novels
American young adult novels
Novels set in high schools and secondary schools
Novels set in Orlando, Florida
Harcourt (publisher) books